The President of the New South Wales Legislative Council is the presiding officer of the upper house of the Parliament of New South Wales, the Legislative Council. The presiding officer of the lower house is the speaker of the Legislative Assembly. The role of President has generally been a partisan office, filled by the governing party of the time. As of May 2021, the president is Matthew Mason-Cox.

Election
Between 1856 and when the Legislative Council was re-constituted in 1934 the president was appointed by the Governor. From 1934 the President was chosen by the council, however there was no contested election between 1934 and 1988. Instead each of Sir John Peden, Ernest Farrar, William Dickson and Sir Harry Budd continued to hold office until they ceased to be a member of the council, regardless of the composition of the council or which party was in government. In 1991 this was changed by legislation that required the president to be chosen by ballot after each election. Since 1991 the president is elected by the Council in a secret ballot. The Clerk of the Council conducts the election. Since that time the Presidency has been a partisan office and the nominee of the government party has nearly always been elected—although this cannot be guaranteed since the government of the day does not necessarily have a majority in the Council. The president is assisted by an elected deputy president, currently vacant following the resignation of Trevor Khan.

Impartiality
The president has a casting vote (in the event of an equality of votes). Like the speaker, the typically president continues to attend party meetings (although incumbent president Matthew Mason-Cox has announced his intention not to attend), and at general elections stands as a party candidate. On the other hand, the president does not usually take part in debates in the Council and does not speak in public on party-political issues. The president is expected to conduct the business of the Council in an impartial and dignified manner.

Section 22I of the NSW Constitution states that "All questions arising in the Legislative Council shall be decided by a majority of the votes of the Members present other than the President or other Member presiding and when the votes are equal the President or other Member presiding shall have a casting vote."

Role
The president’s principal duty is to preside over the Council, although the president is assisted in this by the deputy president and a panel of acting deputy presidents, who usually preside during routine debates. The occupant of the chair must maintain order in the Council, uphold the Standing Orders (rules of procedure) and protect the rights of backbench councillors. The president, in conjunction with the speaker of the Legislative Assembly, also administers Parliament House, Sydney, with the assistance of administrative staff.

Although the president does not have the same degree of disciplinary power as the speaker does, the Council is not as rowdy as most Australian legislative chambers, and thus his or her disciplinary powers are seldom exercised.

Perquisites and ceremony

Following the Westminster tradition inherited from the House of Lords of the United Kingdom, the traditional dress of the speaker includes components of Court dress such as the black silk lay-type gown (similar to a Queen's Counsel gown), a wing collar and a lace jabot or bands (another variation included a white bow tie with a lace jabot), bar jacket, and a full-bottomed wig.

The dress of speakers has often variated according to the party in power, but is determinate on the personal choice of the speaker. Most Labor party presidents eschewed the wig while retaining the court dress, while conservative and independent speakers tended to wear the full dress.

The president, currently, no longer wears the full traditional court dress outfit. Max Willis (1991-1998) was the last president to do so. From 1998 to 2011, all the presidents opted not to wear any dress at all, preferring normal business attire. However, upon his election, President Harwin returned to tradition by wearing the gown during question time and on significant occasions such as the Opening of Parliament. However, there is nothing stopping any given speaker, if they choose to do so, from assuming traditional court dress or anything they deem appropriate.

List of presidents of the Legislative Council

Deputy President and Chair of Committees
Originally titled Chairman of Committees, the current style was adopted on 5 May 2004 during the term of the first female holder of the office. Various legal and constitutional amendments to follow this change were made in the Constitution Amendment (Parliamentary Presiding Officers) Act 2014.

Assistant President

Notes

References

External links
 NSW Legislative Council
 NSW Parliamentary Record

New South Wales
 
1856 establishments in Australia